Figure skating has been contested at the Asian Winter Games since 1986. It was not included in 1990 because of conflicting with 1990 World Figure Skating Championships.

Editions

Events

Medal table

Participating nations

List of medalists

References

External links
 Results of the First Winter Asian Games
 Results of the 6th Winter Asian Games 
 Results of the 5th Winter Asian Games 
 Results of the 4th Winter Asian Games 
 Results of the 3rd Winter Asian Games 
 Results of the First Winter Asian Games

 
Sports at the Asian Winter Games
Asian Winter Games